Samuel  Wynn (4 April 1891 – 17 June 1982) was an Australian Jewish community leader, restaurateur, wine and spirits merchant and Zionist. Wynn was born in Ushimow, Russia (modern Poland), named Shlomo ben David and was the son of Michael David Weintraub and his wife Rivkah, née Feigenbaum

Wynn started his entrepreneurial career in 1918 when he purchased a shop in Bourke Street licensed to sell 'colonial wine' and in 1920 when he bought the Café Denat, which later became the Grossi Florentino restaurant.

References

1891 births
1982 deaths
Australian Jews
Australian people of Polish-Jewish descent
Australian restaurateurs
Australian Zionists
Jews from the Russian Empire
People from Lubartów County
Polish emigrants to Australia